Otan tragoudo (Greek: Όταν τραγουδώ) is the name of a studio album by popular Greek singer Tolis Voskopoulos. It was released in November, 1976 by Minos EMI in Greece and it went gold selling over 50,000 units.

Track listing 

Side One.
 "Ego agapo mia" (Εγώ αγαπώ μία) – (Nini Zaha) – 2:36
 "Na 'tan Thee mou" (Να 'ταν Θεέ μου) feat. Marinella – (Spyros Papavasiliou - Mimis Theiopoulos) – 2:48
 "Ine kati teties nichtes" (Είναι κάτι τέτοιες νύχτες) – (Tolis Voskopoulos - Mimis Theiopoulos) – 3:27
 "Den katalaves kardia mou" (Δεν κατάλαβες καρδιά μου) feat. Marinella – (Tolis Voskopoulos - Mimis Theiopoulos) – 3:09
 "Parakalo" (Παρακαλώ) – (Dimitris Christopoulos - Sakis Kapiris) – 2:26
 "Spoudei anthropi" (Σπουδαίοι άνθρωποι) – (Kostas Hatzis - Sotia Tsotou) – 2:03
Side Two.
 "Otan tragoudo" (Όταν τραγουδώ) – (Nikos Ignatiadis - Mimis Theiopoulos) – 3:13
 "Giati tin agapo" (Γιατί την αγαπώ) – (Nini Zaha) – 3:34
 "Irthe i ora" (Ήρθε η ώρα) – (Tolis Voskopoulos - Manos Koufianakis) – 3:22
 "Anazitiste tin" (Αναζητήστε την) – (Spyros Papavasiliou - Tasos Economou) – 2:51
 "Me vrikes se adynati stigmi" (Με βρήκες σε αδύνατη στιγμή) – (Nikos Ignatiadis) – 2:33
 "Yirna piso agapimeni" (Γύρνα πίσω αγαπημένη) – (Teris Ieremias - Mimis Theiopoulos) – 2:41

Personnel 
 Tolis Voskopoulos - vocals, background vocals
 Marinella - background vocals
 Achilleas Theofilou - producer
 Kostas Klavvas - arranger, conductor on tracks 3, 4, 6, 8, 9 and 12
 Nikos Ignatiadis - arranger and conductor on tracks 1, 5, 7 and 11
 Spyros Papavasiliou - arranger and conductor on tracks 2 and 10
 Yiannis Smyrneos - recording engineer
 Alinta Mavrogeni - photographer

References

1976 albums
Tolis Voskopoulos albums
Greek-language albums
Minos EMI albums